Idogho is a unique surname for people of the Delta area of Urhobo-speaking people of Nigeria and Edo people of Nigeria

The first meaning to be known was a young man which is from Itshekiri name and an Edo name from the Etsakor region of Agenebode. As relationships have been interwoven between people as a result of marriages, the name given to children in a clan becomes increasingly well known from one generation to another. There are three people who were originally known by the name Idogho. There was an Idogho from Ughelli North - Iwhrenẹnẹ, one from Isoko and from Bomadi. As generations come and go, people holding to the surname of their parents, the population of persons answering and bearing the name of Idogho becomes larger. There have been other communities where the name of Idogho is given to children and many more with the name of Idogho.

Notable people 

 Philippa Idogho

References

Surnames